Brandon James Wilson (born 28 January 1997) is an Australian professional footballer who plays as a midfielder for Thai League 1 club Lampang.

Born in Botswana, Wilson moved to Australia at a young age. He later moved to England to play youth football for Burnley before making his senior debut for Stockport County. In 2016, he returned to Australia to play for Perth Glory.

Early life
Wilson was born in Gaborone, Botswana to English parents. Lived in Doncaster, England from the age of two. He moved to Western Australia aged ten.

Club career
Wilson joined Burnley in 2013. He was loaned to Stockport County in 2016.

In July 2016, Wilson returned to Western Australia signing with Perth Glory to play in the A-League. He made his professional debut for Perth Glory on 10 August 2016 in a 2–0 win against Brisbane Roar in the 2016 FFA Cup. Mainly playing as a midfielder, Wilson showed his versatility in December by filling in as the starting right back against Melbourne Victory.

On 28 February 2022, Newcastle Jets announced Wilson had signed with the club on a short-term deal until the end of the 2021–22 A-League Men.

International career
In September 2015, Wilson was named in the Australian under-20 side to travel to Laos for 2016 AFC U-19 Championship qualification. He made his debut for the side in a win over Laos. He is also eligible to represent Botswana at senior level.

In November 2019 he was one of four players suspended by the Australia U23 due to "unprofessional conduct".

Honours
Perth Glory
 A-League: Premiers 2018–19

References

External links

1997 births
Living people
People from Gaborone
Botswana people of English descent
White Botswana people
Botswana footballers
Australian soccer players
Association football midfielders
Burnley F.C. players
Stockport County F.C. players
Perth Glory FC players
Wellington Phoenix FC players
Newcastle Jets FC players
National League (English football) players
National Premier Leagues players
A-League Men players
Brandon Wilson
Brandon Wilson
Australia under-20 international soccer players